Tomás Luceño y Becerra (21 December 1844 – 27 January 1933) was a Spanish poet and playwright.

References

 http://www.worldcat.org/identities/lccn-no93015575/

1844 births
1933 deaths
Spanish dramatists and playwrights
Spanish male dramatists and playwrights
Spanish poets
Spanish male poets